This was the first edition of the tournament.

Asia Muhammed and Yasmin Schnack won the title, defeating Kaitlyn Christian and Maria Sanchez in the final, 6–3, 7–6(7–4).

Seeds

Draw

Draw

References
 Main Draw

FSP Gold River Women's Challenger - Doubles
FSP Gold River Women's Challenger